Stephenie Ann McPherson (born 25 November 1988) is a Jamaican track and field athlete, who specializes in the 400 metres. She has won a bronze medal in the event at the 2013 World Championships, and then placed in the finals of the 2016 Rio Olympics and all three following World Championships between 2015-2019. McPherson earned also a bronze at the 2022 World Indoor Championships. She added medals in the 4 x 400 metres relays, taking a silver at the 2016 Olympics, a gold in 2015 in Beijing, and a bronze in 2019.

In June 2021, McPherson went sub-50 seconds for the first time since 2013, the only year in which she had achieved it, setting her new personal best.

Career
McPherson was the silver medalist from the 2014 World Indoor Championships as a member of the 4 x 400 metres relay team. She took two gold medals at the Commonwealth Games winning the individual 400 m and the 4x400 m relay. Within that same year, she added the gold medal at the Continental Cup as a part of team America in the 4×400 m relay.

In 2022, McPherson won her second global medal after a bronze at the 2013 World Championships, taking also a bronze for the women's 400 metres at the World Indoor Championships in Belgrade, Serbia with a national indoor record of 50.79 seconds. Thus, she improved on her fourth place from the 2016 World Indoors. McPherson also anchored Jamaican women's 4 x 400 relay, winning gold along with teammates Junelle Bromfield, Janieve Russell, and Roneisha McGregor.

Achievements
All information taken from World Athletics profile.

Personal bests

International competitions

Circuit wins and titles
  Diamond League winner (400 m): 2016. (400 metres wins)
 2015: Birmingham British Grand Prix
 2016: Oslo Bislett Games
 2018: London Anniversary Games
 2019: Paris Meeting
 2021: Gateshead British Grand Prix
 Continental Tour – gold level
 2021 (400 m): Székesfehérvár Gyulai István Memorial

National titles
 Jamaican Athletics Championships
 400 m (3): 2016, 2018, 2021

Notes

References

External links

 

Living people
1988 births
Jamaican female sprinters
Commonwealth Games gold medallists for Jamaica
Commonwealth Games medallists in athletics
Athletes (track and field) at the 2014 Commonwealth Games
Athletes (track and field) at the 2018 Commonwealth Games
World Athletics Championships athletes for Jamaica
World Athletics Championships medalists
Athletes (track and field) at the 2016 Summer Olympics
Athletes (track and field) at the 2020 Summer Olympics
Olympic athletes of Jamaica
Medalists at the 2016 Summer Olympics
Olympic silver medalists for Jamaica
Olympic silver medalists in athletics (track and field)
Athletes (track and field) at the 2019 Pan American Games
Pan American Games bronze medalists for Jamaica
Pan American Games medalists in athletics (track and field)
People from Westmoreland Parish
Diamond League winners
IAAF Continental Cup winners
Jamaican Athletics Championships winners
World Athletics Indoor Championships medalists
World Athletics Championships winners
Medalists at the 2019 Pan American Games
Olympic female sprinters
World Athletics Indoor Championships winners
20th-century Jamaican women
21st-century Jamaican women
Medallists at the 2014 Commonwealth Games
Medallists at the 2018 Commonwealth Games